Vedran Samac (born 22 January 1990 in Sremska Mitrovica) is a Serbian athlete specialising in the javelin throw. He represented his country in three European Championships. He also finished fifth at the 2015 Summer Universiade.

His personal best in the event is 81.35 metres set in 2021 European Athletics Team Championships.

International competitions

References

1990 births
Serbian male javelin throwers
Living people
Sportspeople from Sremska Mitrovica